Vitaliy Shumeyko (born 6 October 1981) is a former Ukrainian football defender.

External links
 

1981 births
Living people
Sportspeople from Kryvyi Rih
Ukrainian footballers
Ukrainian expatriate footballers
Expatriate footballers in Russia
Expatriate footballers in Kazakhstan
Association football defenders
Russian Premier League players
FC Elektrometalurh-NZF Nikopol players
FC Oleksandriya players
PFC Spartak Nalchik players
FC Atyrau players
FC Volgar Astrakhan players
FC Khimki players
FC Torpedo Moscow players